The Hogan and Martha A. Runkle Queen House is a historic residence located southeast of Earlham, Iowa, United States. Hogan Queen settled in Madison County in 1853. In addition to farming, Queen was a livestock dealer and he operated a stagecoach stop in his home. The house was also believed to be a stop on the Underground Railroad.

The house is an early example of a vernacular limestone farmhouse. This 2½-story asymmetrical massed rectangular structure is composed of ashlar finished cut quarry faced stone and rubble.  The stone may have been quarried on the farm.  The house features cut out bargeboards, a protruding water table and lintel course, and a gable roof.   It was listed on the National Register of Historic Places in 1987.

References

Houses completed in 1856
Vernacular architecture in Iowa
Houses in Madison County, Iowa
National Register of Historic Places in Madison County, Iowa
Houses on the National Register of Historic Places in Iowa
Underground Railroad in Iowa